Andina is a rural municipality in Madagascar. It belongs to the district of Ambositra, which is a part of Amoron'i Mania Region.

Geography
It is situated at 17 km West from Ambositra.

Mining
There is a Amazonite mine in this municipality.

Rivers
The municipality is situated at the Sahasaonjo river.

Economy
There is a tomato transforming plant in the village of Ampasinabe.

References

Populated places in Amoron'i Mania